The Vélo d'Or (French for "Golden Bicycle") is a cycle racing award, created in 1992 by the French cycling magazine Vélo Magazine. The award is given annually to the rider considered to have performed the best over the year and since 2022 there is also an award for the best female rider.

Originally, Lance Armstrong won the Vélo d'Or five times, but his results were removed after USADA stripped him of his Tour victories. The Vélo d'Or for these years was not given to the second-ranked cyclist. Alberto Contador holds the record of winning the award four times.

There is also another distinction for French racers named "Vélo d'Or français".

Recipients

Men

Women

References

External links
 Vélo Magazine Website 
 Vélo d'Or article

Cycle racing
Cycling awards